Mascheroni is a surname. Notable people with the surname include:

Adriano Mascheroni (died 1531), Italian Roman Catholic prelate
Angelo Mascheroni (1855–1905), Italian pianist composer, conductor, and music teacher
Carlo Mascheroni (born 1940), Italian equestrian
Edoardo Mascheroni (1852–1941), Italian composer and conductor
Ernesto Mascheroni (1907–1984), Uruguayan footballer
Fabio Mascheroni (born 1977), Italian long-distance runner
Lorenzo Mascheroni (1750–1800), Italian mathematician
Marcelo Mascheroni (born 1959), Argentine field hockey player
Oliviero Mascheroni (born 1914), Italian football player